Sergey Viktorovich Krakovsky is a Soviet and Ukrainian former football goalkeeper and current Ukraine national under-17 football team goalkeeping coach.

Career
During his club career he played for FC Dnipro Dnipropetrovsk. He was in the USSR national football team for the 1986 FIFA World Cup, but he did not win any caps for the Soviet Union.

In 2007, he served as the goalkeeping coach of FC Dynamo Kyiv.

References

External links
 

1960 births
Living people
Sportspeople from Mykolaiv
Association football goalkeepers
Ukrainian footballers
Soviet footballers
1986 FIFA World Cup players
MFC Mykolaiv players
FC Dynamo Kyiv players
FC Dnipro players
Hapoel Tzafririm Holon F.C. players
Hapoel Hadera F.C. players
FC Polissya Zhytomyr players
Soviet Top League players
Soviet First League players
Liga Leumit players
Ukrainian expatriate footballers
Expatriate footballers in Israel
Ukrainian expatriate sportspeople in Israel
Ukrainian expatriate sportspeople in Russia
Ukrainian expatriate sportspeople in Kazakhstan
FC Arsenal Kyiv managers
Ukrainian Premier League managers
Ukrainian football managers